Llyn Llywenan (English: Yew Tree Lake) is a lake in western Anglesey, Wales found just over  north of the village of Bodedern and  east of the town of Holyhead. This makes it the largest natural lake on the island—both Llyn Alaw and Llyn Cefni are larger but are man made.

There are two neolithic burial mounds immediately to the south of the lake, one of which is quite complete. The character Lord Owen Griffiths for the American role playing game Castle Falkenstein has a lover Gwagged Annwn Nimüe who, in the game world, lives by the lake.

References

Bodedern
Llywenan